Boston Asian American Film Festival (BAAFF), a production of the Asian American Resource Workshop (AARW), includes a program of independent cinema highlighting recent, significant works by and/or about Asian Americans and the Asian diaspora. BAAFF is New England's largest Asian American film festival. The festival takes place in the month of October in Boston at Emerson College's Bright Family Screening Room in the Paramount Center and opening night in Cambridge at the Brattle Theatre. The 4-day film festival features special premieres, exclusive Q&As with filmmakers and various co-sponsored events around Boston.

History 
BAAFF has been around for over few decades under Asian American Resource Workshop, but finally established its name in 2008 by Susan Chinsen. In 2018, the festival hit its 10-year anniversary, commemorated by 10 days of screenings.

Previous Screenings 
Notable films that have screened at BAAFF starting from 2010 include Bertha Bay-Sa Pan's Almost Perfect, Quentin Lee's White Frog and The People I've Slept With, Michael Kang's Knots, Byron Q's Bang Bang, Minh Duc Nguyen's Touch, Jeff Chiba Stearns's One Big Hapa Family, and a special event honoring veteran actor James Hong entitled "James Hong, Behind the Scenes Secrets of Hollywood."

2018, October 18–28 
Opening Night Retrospective screening for the 25th anniversary of The Joy Luck Club directed by Wayne Wang

Centerpiece Deported directed by Sahra V Nguyen. Post screening Q&A with director Sahra V Nguyen.

Centerpiece Fiction & Other Realities directed by Bobby Choy.

Closing For Izzy directed by Alex Chu.

2017, October 19–22 
Opening Night The Jade Pendant directed by Po-Chih Leung. Post screening Q&A with author/producer L.P. Leung and actor Brian Yang

Centerpiece Resistance at Tule Lake directed by Konrad Aderer. Post screening Q&A with director/producer Konrad Aderer

Closing Night Gook directed by Justin Chon. Post screening Q&A with producer Alex Chi

2016, October 20–23 
Opening Night Tyrus directed by Pamela Tom. Post screening Q&A with director Pamela Tom.

Centerpiece Comfort directed by William Lu. Post screening Q&A with director William Lu and actor Chris Dinh

Closing NIght The Tiger Hunter directed by Lena Khan.

2015, October 22–25 
Opening Night Seoul Searching directed by Benson Lee

Centerpiece The Killing Fields of Dr. Haing S. Ngor directed by Arthur Dong

Closing Night Miss India America directed by Ravi Kapoor

2014, October 23–26

2013, October 24–27 

Opening Night
20th Anniversary of Wedding Banquet with director Ang Lee
Linsanity with producer Brian Yang

Centerpiece
Innocent Blood with producer Trip Hope

Closing Night 
The Way We Dance with director Adam Wong

2012, October 25–28 

Opening Night White Frog drama feature directed by Ellie Wen. Guest Appearance and Q&A with Actor Booboo Stewart, Producer/Writer Ellie Wen and Executive Producer David Henry Hwang. Special Lion Dance Performance by Wah Lum Martial Arts Academy

Centerpiece Sunset Stories drama feature directed by Ernesto Foronda, Silas Howard.

Wedding Palace Comedy feature directed by Christine Yoo

I Am A Ghost (Boston Premiere) Horror feature directed by H.P Mendoza. Screened at Somerville Theatre.

Fear Buffet: A Shorts Program Featuring DUMPLING (dir. Wesley Du), HOW WAR ENDS (dir. Scott Eriksson), FORTUNE COOKIE MAGIC TRICK (dir. Alex Chu), MR. NAKAMURA’S ADDICTION (dir. Scott Eriksson), BLOODTRAFFICK (dir. Jennifer Thym) and DOWN UNDER (dir. Ray Arthur Wang)

Pui Chan: Kung Fu Pioneer (New England Premiere) documentary directed by Mimi Chan

Model Minority (New England Premiere) Directed by Lily Mariye

Mr. Cao Goes To Washington (Boston Premiere) Directed by S. Leo Chiang

Yes, We're Open (Boston Premiere) Directed by Richard Wong

Reel Food: A Shorts Program Featuring WONDER BOY (dir. Corrie Chen), PEOPLE AREN’T ALL BAD (dir. Matthew Hashiguchi), THE COMMITMENT (dir. Albert M. Chan), BLEACHED (dir. Jessica Dela Merced), CAFÉ ELEVE (dir. Kelly Li), MY 2009 EXPERIENCE (dir. Henry Ho), COMMITMENT (dir. Raahul Singh) and NANI (dir. Justin Tipping) A showcase of some of the finest short films by up-and-coming filmmakers who make cinematic forays into personal identity, family crises and everything else in life. Special Appearance by filmmakers Henry Ho (dir. My 2009 Experience), Albert Chan (dir. The Commitment), and Kelly Li (dir, Café Eleve)

Closing Night Shanghai Calling (Boston Premiere) Directed by Daniel Hsia

2011, November 10–13 

Opening Night 7:00PM Almost Perfect (Boston Premiere) Post-screening Q&A with director Bertha Bay-Sa Pan, actor Tina Chen Opening Performance by The Genki Spark: Taiko Projects with Attitude

7:00PM Spotlight Event: James Hong | Behind the Scenes Secrets of Hollywood Actor James Hong has a prolific film and television career that spans 57 years with more than 500 roles. In this spotlight event, Mr. Hong will speak about his career and reveal secrets about the magic and realities of Hollywood. Co-presented by MIT Asian American Association, MIT Inventing Our Future, WGBH and Chinese Historical Society of New England (CHSNE)

9:15PM Potluck Shorts: Art of Love
Shorts program includes: The Potential Wives of Norman Mao, Angel Island Profile: Tyrus Wong, Asian American Jesus, Wear I Fit, The Bus Pass, Brides Wanted, Room #11, Lunchtime, and Mother. Co-presented by MIT Asian American Association, MIT Inventing Our Future, Queer East, Boston LGBT Film Festival, and Channel APA.

2:00PM | One Big Hapa Family (documentary directed by Jeff Chiba Stearns) Post-screening Q&A with director Jeff Chiba Stearns Co-presented by New England Japanese American Citizens League and Discover Roxbury. Screened at AMC Loews Boston Common.

6:30PM | Touch (Drama feature directed by Minh Duc Nguyen) Post-screening Q&A with director Minh Duc Nguyen. Co-presented by Viet AID and Intercollegiate Vietnamese Students Association. Preceded by short, Heart by Erick Oh Screened at AMC Loews Boston Common.

9:00PM | Bang Bang (Drama feature directed by Byron Q Post-screening Q&A with director Byron Q. Co-presented by The Coalition for Asian Pacific American Youth. Screened at AMC Loews Boston Common.

1:00PM |  Potluck Shorts: Passion & Courage The film program presents a collection of ten evocative shorts that explore themes of perseverance, heart, and ambition. Shorts program includes: Fatakra, A Tree Falls in Forest, Ballet of Unhatched Chicks, Boys and Girls, The First Draft of Yao Ming's Retirement Speech, Memory of Forgotten War, My Name is Seven, N as in Name: Danh Nguyen, Rehearsing the Future, and Top Spin. Co-presented by MIT Asian American Association, MIT Inventing Our Future, Queer East, and Boston LGBT Film Festival. Screened at MIT.

Closing Night 4:30PM | Knots (drama feature directed by Michael Kang Post-screening Q&A with Director Michael Kang and Writer/Actor Kimberly-Rose Wolter Co-presented by Boston Korea. Screened at AMC Loews Boston Common.

2010, November 11–14 

7:30pm Today's Special  
Co-presented by the National Association of Asian American Professionals (NAAAP)-Boston 
Opening Performance by The Genki Spark: Taiko Projects with Attitude
2009 | 99 mins | Comedy Stuart Street Playhouse 200 Stuart Street, Boston (T: Arlington)

7:00pm AOKI | Infamy Co-Presented by Discover Roxbury, Boston Center for Community and Justice, and New England Japanese American Citizen LeagueInfamy 
2008 | 4 mins | Drama AOKI 2009 | 94 mins | Documentary 
Paramount Center, Bright Family Screening Room 559 Washington Street, Boston (T: Boylston/Downtown Crossing)

9:15pm Got Shorts? Co-Presented by Korean Student Association at UMASS Boston, Boston Progress, and Boston Chinatown Neighborhood Center (BCNC), and the National Association of Asian American Professionals (NAAAP)- Boston
2009-2010 | 100 mins | 8 shorts 
When Five Fell | Humberville Poetry Slam |  Clap Clap | Andy | Topi | Master of His Domain | Space Cadet |  Ajumma! Are you Krazy???  
Paramount Center, Bright Family Screening Room 559 Washington Street, Boston

2:00pm Race, Acting, Sexuality, and Asian American Masculinities Co-Presented by Coalition for Asian Pacific American Youth (CAPAY) and Institute for Asian American Studies at UMASS Boston
Lead Actor Bee Vang of Gran Torino Hmong Media Expert, Louisa Schein 
Tufts Medical Center 800 Washington Street, Boston (T: Tufts Medical Center)

8:00pm The People I've Slept With Co-Presented by Harvard AAA, Boston Asian American Student Intercollegiate Conference (BAASIC), and the National Association of Asian American Professionals (NAAAP)- Boston
2009 | 89 mins | Comedy
Harvard University, Science Center C 1 Oxford Street, Cambridge  (T: Harvard Square)

3:00pm The Things We Carry | La Petite Salon Co-Presented by Asian Sisters Participating In Reaching Excellence (ASPIRE), The Asian American Center at Northeastern University, and Boston University's Asian Women's Health Initiative Project (AWSHIP)

The Things We Carry 2009 | 77 mins | Drama  
La Petite Salon 2009 | 15 mins | Drama
Brattle Theater 40 Brattle Street, Cambridge (T: Harvard Square)

References

Asian-American culture in Boston
Film festivals in Boston
Asian-American film festivals